Aeropus may refer to:

Aeropus, brother of Perdiccas I, who was the first king of Macedonia of the family of Temenus
Aeropus I of Macedon, King of Macedon, 602–576 BC
Aeropus II of Macedon, King of Macedon, 399–393 BC
Aeropus of Lyncestis, commander of Philip II
Aeropus, a son of Cepheus, King of Tegea, in Greek mythology
Aeropus, in Greek mythology a kind of bird into which Botres was changed
The Nemerçkë mountain range shared between Greece and Albania

Masculine given names